The 2020 Indy Lights season was to have been the 35th season of the Indy Lights open wheel motor racing series and the 19th sanctioned by IndyCar, acting as the primary support series for the IndyCar Series. The opening round at St. Petersburg was suspended mid-way due to the COVID-19 pandemic. The following rounds were also delayed, as a revised calendar was released on March 26, 2020. The season was later cancelled entirely and the series went into a hiatus until 2021, making it the first time in history that the Indy Lights season did not run.

Team and driver chart
The following drivers and teams were announced prior to the cancellation of the season.

Schedule 

The following was the revised schedule prior to the cancellation of the season.

See also
2020 IndyCar Series
2020 Indy Pro 2000 Championship
2020 U.S. F2000 National Championship

References

External links 
 

Indy Lights
Indy Lights seasons
Indy Lights